Simon Mijok Majak is a south Sudanese politician and the Minister of Roads and Bridges as of 2022.

Work 
During his reign as minister there are a couple of achievements and challenges that he faced.

The 3.6-kilometre-long Freedom Bridge.

And a challenge of the $700 million 400 kilometres Juba – Wau highway which was washed away by rains.

References 

South Sudanese politicians
Living people
Year of birth missing (living people)